Clifton Lewis "Buddy" Kennedy (born October 5, 1998) is an American professional baseball third baseman in the Arizona Diamondbacks organization.

Amateur career 
Born and raised in Millville, New Jersey, Kennedy attended Millville Senior High School, where he played baseball and batted .493 with six home runs as a senior in 2017. He was selected by the Arizona Diamondbacks in the fifth round of the 2017 Major League Baseball draft. He signed for $550,000, forgoing his commitment to play college baseball at the University of North Carolina.

Professional career 
Kennedy made his professional debut with the Arizona League Diamondbacks, batting .270 with nine doubles, eight triples, and twenty RBIs over fifty games. In 2018, he played with the Missoula Osprey with whom he slashed .327/.396/.465 with four home runs and 32 RBIs over 57 games. For the 2019 season, he played for the Kane County Cougars, hitting .262 with seven home runs and 49 RBIs over 101 games. He did not play a minor league game in 2020 after the season was cancelled due to the COVID-19 pandemic. Kennedy began the 2021 season with the Hillsboro Hops and was promoted to the Amarillo Sod Poodles in mid-June. Over 96 games between the two clubs, Kennedy slashed .290/.384/.523 with 22 home runs, sixty RBIs, and 16 stolen bases. He was selected to play in the Arizona Fall League for the Salt River Rafters after the season.

Kennedy was assigned to the Reno Aces of the Triple-A Pacific Coast League to begin the 2022 season. On June 17, the Diamondbacks selected his contract and he made his MLB debut that night as the starting designated hitter versus the Minnesota Twins. He recorded his first MLB hit that night with a single off of Devin Smeltzer. On June 19, he recorded his first MLB home run, a grand slam versus Caleb Thielbar of the Minnesota Twins. He was sent outright off the roster on November 11, 2022.

Personal life 
Kennedy is close friends with Los Angeles Angels outfielder Mike Trout and trains with him in the off-season. Kennedy's grandfather, Don Money, played in MLB for the Philadelphia Phillies and Milwaukee Brewers.

References

External links

1998 births
Living people
People from Millville, New Jersey
Baseball players from New Jersey
Major League Baseball third basemen
Arizona Diamondbacks players
Arizona League Diamondbacks players
Millville Senior High School alumni
Missoula Osprey players
Kane County Cougars players
Hillsboro Hops players
Amarillo Sod Poodles players
Salt River Rafters players
Reno Aces players
Sportspeople from Cumberland County, New Jersey